Horizon Organic is an American company, founded in 1991, that produces organic milk and other organic food products. Horizon Organic is the largest supplier of organic milk in North America. Its products are sold in supermarkets and grocery stores. Horizon produces organic milk in Maryland and also purchases the majority of its organic milk (more than 99 percent) from more than 700 dairies in 23 states.

Prior to being acquired by (now former parent company) Dean Foods, Horizon was a public company and owner of the organic dairy brands: Juniper Valley Farms, The Organic Cow of Vermont and United Kingdom brand Rachel's Organic. Horizon Organic's products are certified organic by the USDA and advertised as free of antibiotics, growth hormones and pesticides.

History 
Horizon was founded in Boulder, Colorado in 1991 and began selling nationally in 1994. The company sponsored a local K-8 school's extracurricular activities and even named their mascot, the Horizon Heifers. The company went public in 1998 and was acquired by Dean Foods in 2004.

In 2006, the Organic Consumers Association organized a boycott of Horizon Organic (and Aurora Organic Dairy), alleging that the company was not following organic standards.  In August, the Cornucopia Institute filed a complaint with the USDA alleging that Horizon Organic violated National Organic Program standards in reference to the amount of time their dairy cows should spend in pasture. As a result of the boycott, one of the largest natural food cooperatives, PCC Natural Markets in Seattle, decided to discontinue Horizon Organic products from their customer offerings.

In 2009, (now former) parent company Dean Foods was sued by a group of dairymen for allegedly creating a monopoly on milk in the Southeastern U.S. In 2010 Horizon published "Organic Standards of Care" guidelines which outlines its livestock and organic dairy practices 

In 2013, WhiteWave Foods (owner of the Horizon brand) became an independent company from Dean Foods.

In July 2016 it was announced that the French company Danone would purchase WhiteWave Foods for $10.4 billion.  The acquisition was completed in April 2017 and newly formed company is named DanoneWave

References

External links
 

Agriculture companies of the United States
Dairy products companies of the United States
1991 establishments in Colorado
Organic farming organizations
Organic farming in the United States
Groupe Danone brands